Mohamed Samir Qotb (16 March 1938 — 28 June 2006) was an Egyptian footballer who played as a midfielder for Zamalek. He also played for the Egyptian national team, was part of the team that won the 1957 Africa Cup of Nations, and represented his country in the 1960 and 1964 Summer Olympics.

Honours
Zamalek
 Egyptian Premier League: 1959–60, 1963–64, 1963–64
 Egypt Cup: 1956–57, 1957–58, 1958–59, 1959–60, 1961–62
Egypt
 Africa Cup of Nations: 1957

References

External links
Profile at FIFA.com

1938 births
2006 deaths
Sportspeople from Alexandria
Egyptian footballers
Association football midfielders
Egypt international footballers
Zamalek SC players
Olympic footballers of Egypt
Footballers at the 1960 Summer Olympics
Footballers at the 1964 Summer Olympics
1957 African Cup of Nations players
1962 African Cup of Nations players
Africa Cup of Nations-winning players
Egyptian Premier League players
20th-century Egyptian people